Thomas Hope Blyth (16 October 1876 – 16 December 1949) was an English footballer who scored on his only appearance in the Football League for Newcastle United. He played as a centre forward.

Personal life 
Blyth worked as a schoolmaster. He served as a bombardier and a signaller in the Royal Garrison Artillery during the First World War.

Career statistics

References 

English Football League players

Place of death missing
British Army personnel of World War I
English footballers
Newcastle United F.C. players
1876 births
1949 deaths
Sportspeople from Seaham
Footballers from County Durham
Association football forwards
Royal Garrison Artillery soldiers
Military personnel from County Durham